Marlen Andrea Véliz Florián (born 11 February 1993), known as  Andrea Véliz, is a Guatemalan retired footballer who played as a defender. She has been a member of the Guatemala women's national team.

International career
Véliz capped for Guatemala at senior level during the 2010 Central American and Caribbean Games.

References

1993 births
Living people
Guatemalan women's footballers
Guatemala women's international footballers
Women's association football defenders